Radville is a small town in Canadian province of Saskatchewan. The town is in the RM of Laurier No. 38. It was incorporated in 1911 after being settled in 1895. Highway 28 and Highway 377 pass through the town. Nearby communities include the village of Ceylon, 23 km to the west, and the city of Weyburn, 51 km to the north-east. Major nearby urban centres include Regina, which is 148 km to the north, and Moose Jaw, which is 143 km north-west.

A small river, Long Creek, runs along the northern and eastern side of the town, providing fishing and recreation to the locals. To the south of town, a second dam is located for the water supply pumphouse.

History

Radville used to be a major hub of activity throughout the 1920s to 1970s with a livery, the Canadian National Railway (CN), and five grain elevators. Radville was also a CN divisional point. It had a roundhouse with turntable, water tank, sand house, coal dock, ice house, bunkhouse, Roadmaster office, stores, stockyard, loading platform, freight, and express service. The Radville railway station still remains though now used as a museum. At one time in the town, there was a blacksmith shop four general stores, dress shop, bakery, Watson's Hardware Store, Clarke's Electric, appliance store, Credit Union, jeweller, two barber shops, a dry cleaner, two lumber yards, Vennard's locker plant, liquor store, and a law office. This diminished when Highway No. 28 was upgraded in about 1975. With horses virtually gone and replaced by automobiles and substantially improved roads, the next largest urban centre of Weyburn received more and more of Radville's local regional commerce.

Notable buildings
One of the historic buildings in Radville is the local restaurant. The building started as the Bon Ton Barber Shop and the first doctor in Radville, Dr. Joseph P. O'Shea's office, which later became the Radville Café, followed with the Paris Café, the Boston Café, the Lasalle, the Glencoe, the Canadian Café, the Radville Family Restaurant, and in 2002, the Radville Family Restaurant II.

Radville has had several theatres. The last one, the Oasis Theatre, closed its doors in 1977, showing Star Wars as one of its last movies. After standing empty for a few years, the Oasis was bought by local entrepreneur George Hays and converted into the Alley Oops bowling alley. The newspaper South Saskatchewan Star was owned and operated by Oscar Stitt. A few years afterwards, George Hays purchased the local newspaper, the Radville Star, and moved the publication into the same building. The Princess Theatre, owned by Ham Ferris, closed much earlier and was converted into a senior citizens hall in 1972.

The Canadian Imperial Bank of Commerce, originally the Bank of Commerce, was built in the early 1920s and closed in 2017. The Empire Hotel was built in the early 1920s and is still in operation.

Eva McNaught, who was wife to the fire chief and drayman Harold, ran Eva's Popcorn stand for many years. Due to the warm long languishing summer nights typical of southern prairie towns, many people stayed out in the evenings and enjoyed the Saskatchewan summer weather. A replica of Eva's Popcorn Stand was built in 2010 and runs entirely by volunteers, in the evenings of the summer months.

The Radville CN Station was completely restored in 2010 and is now a very impressive museum. Artifacts from local settlers have been collected and are displayed throughout the station. Many activities are hosted at the Museum throughout the year, including the annual "Harvest Day" where locals enjoy an old fashioned outing with live music, a car show, pie contest, silent auction, Soap Box Races on main street, BBQ supper, and beer gardens. This event is usually held in late September.

Education

The Radville Public School, a traditional 3-storey cube-shaped red brick building, burned to the ground on January 16, 1977. A mimeograph machine with its alcohol-based image transfer fluid created an explosion in the staff office on the second floor. Picture windows across the street were cracked as a result of the explosion. The new Radville Elementary School opened a few years later. In the interim, the students were sent to classrooms in the high school, and the younger students were sent to the Catholic school.

The high school was called the Radville Regional High School. The Catholic school, commonly called the Separate School, is named St. Olivier School. There was also the Christian College, Western Christian College, located on the east side of Long Creek.

Larsen Dam
About a mile north of the town is a dam on the creek, commonly referred to as the Radville Dam or the Larsen Dam. This water reserve was used as the primary water reservoir for Radville until approximately 1984, at which time the town decided to use deep drilled water wells. The dam is stocked by the wildlife and fisheries department of the government. In the 1970s and the earlier 1980s, the dam was stocked with northern pike (or "jackfish") and fresh water perch. Later it was stocked with pickerel (or "walleye") and then with trout.

Radville-Laurier Regional Park 
Radville-Laurier Regional Park was originally established in 1965 and renamed in 1975 to its current name to reflect the partnership between the RM and the town. The park is located adjacent to the town and features most of the recreational facilities for the region. There's 42 campsites, 12 of which are electrified, ball diamonds, playgrounds, an outdoor swimming pool, golf course, and a recreation centre.

The recreation centre has a community hall, skating rink (which is home to the Radville Nationals hockey team), curling rink, the aforementioned swimming pool, seasonal concession, and the registration offices. The golf course, called Robertdale Golf and Country Club, is a 9-hole sand greens golf course named in honour of A.R. Robertson, who had devoted many hours to the club. It is a par 35 course with a total of 2,953 yards.

Transportation
Saskatchewan Highway 28 
Saskatchewan Highway 377
Radville Airport

Demographics 

Notable people 
 Darcy Verot, professional ice hockey player
 Roy Bailey (politician)
 Vernon Claffey: a walkway was built in 1994 and named Claffey Blvd, in honour of Vernon Claffey, who was the garbage man for Radville from the late 1930s to 1980s. Claffey provided many old toys that he personally gathered and fixed to the poorer families in Radville.
 Roderick E. MacDonald KC - Lawyer (retired): public interest volunteer activist on issues about Rural Health Care Services in Saskatchewan and about National Environmental conflicts. Recipient of The YMCA Canada Peace Medal and the Queen Elizabeth II Platinum Jubilee Medal. Practice Advisor, Law Society of Saskatchewan  University of Regina (BA), University of Saskatchewan (LLB), Harvard Law School (Certificate In Negotiation)

See also
List of communities in Saskatchewan
List of towns in Saskatchewan

References

External links

Towns in Saskatchewan
Laurier No. 38, Saskatchewan
Division No. 2, Saskatchewan